The Wilderness of Manitoba are a Canadian indie folk band who formed in 2009 in Toronto. They have released five albums.

The band's membership has changed multiple times, and has shifted from a quintet to a quartet. The constant member has been lead vocalist, guitarist and keyboardist Will Whitwham. Current recording and touring members of the band include Victoria Carr (vocals/guitar), Tavo Diez de Bonilla (bass/vocals). In 2018, drummer and vocalist Mike Brushey was succeeded by Adam Balsam who died on the October 29, 2021 release date of "Farewell To Cathedral".

Alex Lifeson from the band Rush is a guest guitarist on the track "Shift" from the album Between Colours.

Discography 
 2009: Hymns of Love & Spirits (re-issued in 2011)
 2010: When You Left the Fire
 2012: DelawareHouse (EP)
 2012: Island of Echoes
 2013: The Leslieville Sessions (EP)
 2014: Between Colours
 2017: Across the Dark
 2018: The Tin Shop (EP)
 2021: Farewell To Cathedral

References 

Musical groups from Toronto
Canadian indie rock groups
2009 establishments in Ontario
Musical groups established in 2009